HMS Trafalgar was a 120-gun first-rate ship of the line of the Royal Navy, launched on 21 June 1841 at Woolwich Dockyard. HMS Trafalgar was the last ship to complete the successful .

The ship was named by Lady Bridport, niece of  Lord Nelson at the request of Queen Victoria, who with Prince Albert also attended the launch. The wine used was some kept from  after returning from Trafalgar. Five hundred people were on board the ship at the time of its launch, of whom 100 had been at Trafalgar. It was estimated 500,000 people came to watch the event and the Thames was covered for miles with all manner of boats. The launch was the subject of the most notable work by Woolwich-based artist William Ranwell. She was engaged in the Bombardment of Sebastopol on  17 October 1854 during the Crimean War.

Trafalgar was fitted with screw propulsion in 1859. As training ship at Portland, she was renamed HMS Boscawen in 1873, and finally sold out of the service in 1906. Commander Lawrence de Wahl Satow was appointed in command 15 April 1902.

Notes

References

Duckers, Peter (2011) The Crimean War at Sea: The Naval Campaigns against Russia, 1854-56. Pen & Sword Maritime. .
 Lavery, Brian (2003) The Ship of the Line - Volume 1: The development of the battlefleet 1650-1850. Conway Maritime Press. .
 Lyon, David and Winfield, Rif (2004) The Sail and Steam Navy List: All the Ships of the Royal Navy 1815-1889. Chatham Publishing, London. .

External links
 

Ships of the line of the Royal Navy
Caledonia-class ships of the line
Ships built in Woolwich
1841 ships